Sigyet khauk swe is a fried noodle dish in Burmese cuisine. Egg or wheat noodles are fried in sigyet (i.e., oil infused with garlic aroma), fried garlic, topped with a protein like duck or roast duck, and optionally garnished with sliced cucumbers and green onions. The dish is associated with the Sino-Burmese community.

References

See also
Khauk swè

Burmese cuisine
Fried noodles